Skishing is a variant on saltwater shorefishing that involves wearing a buoyant wetsuit and swimming out from shore with flippers to fish with rod and reel (typically a surfcasting rod), often using live eels. It is practiced as a means of getting further out to sea in order to increase the chances of catching a fish and can be dangerous. The term skishing is a portmanteau of water-skiing and fishing because when hooked the stripers pull the angler through the water. Skishing has been described as extreme surfcasting.

One enthusiast of skishing believes that "hard core" surf casters aren't fond of the activity and consider it cheating.

Skishing was the subject of an article in Forbes magazine. The activity was invented by Paul Melnyk, a cabinet maker from Montauk, New York. Melnyk has explained that the activity is similar to skiing because "if you hook a fish over thirty pounds, it will generally take you for a ride".

A description of skishing on Stripercoast Surfcasters web forum as told by Jacob Freeman.

" It really has to be experienced to be understood, but it's definitely not for everyone. I would hesitate to recommend it to anyone who is not at least a little crazy. But for me, skishing is to surfcasting, as a hurricane is to a windy day.

To be immersed in the element that holds your quarry, bass sometimes swimming so close to you that you can kick them, feeling the raw power of a big bass pull you around, wrestling one on one with a big fish in their element is unreal. They don't give up when they're still in the water, and you can't lift a big bass out of the water when you're swimming, so it can become a friggen wrestling match until you get your hook out if the fish is still green. I always crush the barbs of my hooks for an easier release anyway, so sometimes you can just give them some slack and they'll release themselves if it's just a lip hook. With an 11' rod, you really have a lot more leverage than most would think, and with some practice you can horse a fish in (or pull yourself closer to it) rather quickly.

Skishing also provides the surfcaster with access to many very fishy areas that are not accessible from shore or frequented by boats due to the hazardous rocks and reefs. How many times have you been standing on a rock or on the beach and the fish are busting beyond your casting range? That's frustrating. Skishing lets you get out to where they are."

SKISHING description: "It was an extraordinary feeling for me to be floating weightless in this dynamic sea, and I felt as thought I had shed every pound of excess baggage as I rode the tide . . . Fighting a substantial fish while swimming is a unique experience. A balance must be achieved between the hunter and the prey. Any variation to this equilibrium causes a loss of control as the fish pulls. I was kicking hard to keep myself upright, fighting the fish while using my whole body as leverage. . . A swarm of splashing bodies soon surrounded me."

References

External links
 "Skishing Gear & Safety", Jacob Freeman 
 "Stripercoastsurfcasters.us "What is skishing like?"
 "Swimming With The Fishes", On The Run: An Angler's Journey Down the Striper Coast, David DiBenedetto 

Outdoor recreation
Recreational fishing
Fishing techniques and methods